Darius Leseaun Harris (born January 17, 1996) is an American football linebacker for the Kansas City Chiefs of the National Football League (NFL). He played college football at Middle Tennessee.

Professional career

After playing four years at Middle Tennessee, Harris was signed by the Kansas City Chiefs as an undrafted free agent on April 29, 2019. On July 24, he was placed on the non-football injury reserve while recovering from a shoulder injury he suffered late in college, spending the entire season there. Without Harris, the Chiefs won Super Bowl LIV against the San Francisco 49ers.

Harris returned to the Chiefs the next season, but was waived on September 5, 2020 and was signed to the practice squad the next day. On September 30, he was promoted from the practice squad.

On October 9, 2021, Harris was waived by the Chiefs and re-signed to the practice squad. He signed a reserve/future contract with the Chiefs on February 2, 2022.

Harris won his second Super Bowl ring when the Chiefs won Super Bowl LVII 38-35 against the Philadelphia Eagles with Harris recording 1 tackle in the game.

References

External links
Kansas City Chiefs bio
Middle Tennessee Blue Raiders bio

1996 births
Living people
American football linebackers
Kansas City Chiefs players
Middle Tennessee Blue Raiders football players
Players of American football from Mississippi
African-American players of American football
21st-century African-American sportspeople